John Dwyer may refer to:

 John Dwyer (Australian judge) (1879–1966), Australian judge
 John Dwyer (baseball) (active 1882), American baseball player
 John Dwyer (field hockey) (born 1928), Australian Olympic hockey player
 John Dwyer (medicine) (born 1939), Australian professor of medicine
 John Dwyer (musician) (born 1974), American musician
 John Dwyer (police officer) (active 2012–2016), British police officer
 John Dwyer (VC) (1890–1962), Australian soldier
 John M. Dwyer (born 1926), American set decorator
 John J. Dwyer (1856–1911), American architect
 Jack Dwyer (1927–1997), American football player

See also
John O'Dwyer (born 1991), Irish hurler